Virginia Díaz Rivas (born 15 August 1991) is a Spanish rower. She competed in the women's coxless pair event at the 2020 Summer Olympics.

Alongside coxless pair partner Aina Cid, Díaz Rivas has won a gold, silver and bronze medal at the European Rowing Championships. She also placed fifth with Cid at the 2019 World Rowing Championships.

References

External links

1991 births
Living people
Spanish female rowers
Olympic rowers of Spain
Rowers at the 2020 Summer Olympics
Sportspeople from Cantabria
Mediterranean Games bronze medalists for Spain
Mediterranean Games medalists in rowing
Competitors at the 2018 Mediterranean Games